"Back Burners" is the seventh episode of the third season of the HBO original series The Wire. The episode was written by Joy Lusco from a story by David Simon & Joy Lusco and was directed by Tim Van Patten. It originally aired on November 7, 2004.

Plot 
Omar visits Butchie to discuss Bunk's lecture about the loss of morality in their neighborhood. Butchie dismisses it as a ploy by Bunk, but Omar cannot put his conscience to rest. He locates Dozerman's weapon, which Butchie hands to Bunk. Elsewhere, Carcetti questions Burrell and verifies that Mayor Royce has not acted on his request to look into the death of the state's witness. D'Agostino convinces Carcetti to meet with Royce again, and hold off on attacking him for any continued inaction until a time closer to the mayoral primaries. Carcetti approaches Royce a second time to discuss changes to the way the city protects witnesses, but the mayor claims there is no money available. Carcetti types a letter of concern while Royce and Burrell hold a press conference on the return of Dozerman's weapon.

In the Western, Slim Charles tells Avon that Marlo has withdrawn his operation from all of his corners; Avon orders him to take the corners as soon as the police watching them leave. As they drive away, Herc, one of the officers surveilling Avon, recognizes him. Colvin discusses his statistics with Lieutenant Mello and the Western's community relations sergeant, which show that crime is up near Hamsterdam but down in the rest of the district. Mello thinks the bosses should know that what they are doing is working, but Colvin insists that it should be kept a secret for the time being, to make sure the numbers are sustainable. In Hamsterdam, Bubbles finds the area overwhelmingly chaotic and hellish, even by the standards of what he has experienced before. He learns that addicts living there need basic supplies to get by. Bubbles spots Johnny, who refuses to leave. A fight breaks out and the uniformed officers break it up.

Herc and Colicchio refuse to help Sergeant Carver as he assists in the Hamsterdam experiment. When Carver remarks that there are too many children, Colicchio notes that many of them are now unemployed because lookouts and runners are not needed if trade is legal. Carver tells the dealers that they have to pay one hundred dollars a week to deal in Hamsterdam, with the money going towards supporting the children. Carver uses the first of the cash to buy a basketball hoop for the children. Colvin visits Hamsterdam that night, at which point the basketball hoop has already been destroyed. Meanwhile, Marlo tells Partlow they are going to step back and wholesale their package to other dealers and let Avon take their corners. Marlo hopes to bide his time to catch Avon unaware.

Bernard purchases batches of disposable phones for Shamrock, sticking to Bell's rules by buying only two phones from any single outlet. His girlfriend, Squeak, complains about the time-consuming errands and wants to buy the phones in bulk. Squeak eventually convinces Bernard by offering him oral sex in exchange. Elsewhere, Donette tells Bell that Brianna is planning to visit the police station to talk to McNulty about D'Angelo's death. An angered Bell learns that Brianna has been in contact with Levy, who recommends that they tell Avon. Bell says he will handle it. Meanwhile, Slim Charles assigns Poot to one of Marlo's corners with some muscle for protection. Poot is worried about retaliation from Marlo. Later, Snoop kills one of Poot's men in a drive-by shooting.

At the Major Crimes Unit, Daniels reports that Bell and Marlo are the unit's new targets. He calls McNulty into his office, accurately suspecting he used Colvin to force the unit's change in direction. An unapologetic McNulty defends his actions, upon which Daniels tells him that he will be out of the unit once Bell is arrested. Freamon and Prez analyze the phone that Bubbles procured, but the information is difficult to interpret without knowing more about Marlo's organization. Freamon comments that a phone from the Barksdale organization would allow them to map out the organization with everything that they already know but it would be difficult to get a wiretap up with the phones being disposed of so quickly.

McNulty, Greggs, and Sydnor restart their surveillance work, waiting for Bodie to dump a phone. McNulty convinces them to share a drink with him, causing them to narrowly miss Avon's meeting with Bodie. When Greggs comes home drunk, an argument ensues with Cheryl, who asks her to leave. The next morning, Shamrock phones Bodie and Puddin and recommends that they relocate to Hamsterdam. On their way to the zone, their SUV is stopped by McNulty and Greggs. McNulty covertly swaps out Bodie's phone for a similar model, while Bodie and the dealers angrily mention Hamsterdam several times. After being called to assist McNulty and Greggs, Carver is forced to tell them what Hamsterdam is. Colvin arrives to explain his plan to the unit, asking them to keep it secret.

They return to the detail, Greggs asks Massey if she can stay at her place for a while, while Prez reports the information he found on D'Agostino to McNulty. Using the information, McNulty dons a suit and attends a Washington fundraiser, where he runs into her and arranges another one night stand. The following day, McNulty arrives late and finds Pearlman and Daniels receiving a briefing from Freamon and Prez, who have identified a communication network with fifteen distinct phone users by analyzing call patterns. They have identified a coordinator who acts as a nexus for communications. The detectives have also found that the phones are pre-programmed with the numbers before being put into use. Freamon asks Greggs to have the Western DEU squad collect phones for them.

Greggs and McNulty meet with Herc and Carver and ask them to collect any stray burners they find. Herc tells them that he saw Avon driving around the neighborhood, which McNulty and Greggs both refuse to believe. Upon returning to the office, they check Avon's status on the computer and, along with Daniels, are outraged when they find he has been paroled. Meanwhile, having left the game for good, Cutty reapplies himself to the casual landscaping job he was working before. The crew boss convinces him to return to the Deacon, to whom Cutty discusses his state of mind. He says he is tired of doing things he doesn't want to do and wants to change, and asks the Deacon to call him Dennis.

Production

Title reference 
The title refers to the disposable cell phones used by the Barksdale organization.  The idiom "put on the back burner" refers to making something less of a priority, or switch focus to something else.  The drug dealer Williamson is put on the back burner as Bell and Stanfield are made the new targets and arresting Bodie's crew becomes less important than the Hamsterdam cops-dealers pact. The title can also refer to the "back door" move made on Lieutenant Daniels by Detective McNulty in getting the investigative targets changed.

Epigraph 

Butchie uses this phrase when talking to Omar about his problems with Bunk over the death of Tosha.

Credits 
A dedication ran at the beginning of the closing credits:

"In memory of Geraldine Peroni; editor, colleague, friend. 1953-2004"

Guest stars 
 Glynn Turman as Mayor Clarence Royce
 Chad L. Coleman as Dennis "Cutty" Wise
 Jamie Hector as Marlo Stanfield
 Brandy Burre as Theresa D'Agostino
 Melanie Nicholls King as Cheryl
 Delaney Williams as Sergeant Jay Landsman
 Leo Fitzpatrick as Johnny
 S. Robert Morgan as Butchie
 Melvin Williams as The Deacon
 Megan Anderson as Jen Carcetti
 Shamyl Brown as Donette
 Jay Landsman as Lieutenant Dennis Mello
 Richard Burton as Sean "Shamrock" McGinty
 Tray Chaney as Malik "Poot" Carr
 Anwan Glover as Slim Charles
 Benjamin Busch as Officer Anthony Colicchio
 Mia Arnice Chambers as Squeak
 Melvin Jackson Jr. as Bernard
 Ryan Sands as Officer Lloyd "Truck" Garrick
 De'Rodd Hearns as Puddin
 Michael Kostroff as Maurice Levy
 Felicia Pearson as Snoop
 Rico Whelchel as Rico
 Gbenga Akinnagbe as Chris Partlow
 R. Emery Bright as Community Relations Sergeant
 Eugene Little as landscaping crew chief
 Cleo Reginald Pizana as Coleman Parker

Uncredited appearances 
 Rick Otto as Officer Kenneth Dozerman
 Joilet F. Harris as Officer Caroline Massey
 Richard DeAngelis as Colonel Raymond Foerster
 Gregory L. Williams as Detective Crutchfield
 Robert X. Golphin as Crackhead

First appearances 
 Bernard: Barksdale organization member responsible for purchasing the disposable cell phones they use.
 Squeak: Bernard's nagging girlfriend.
 Detective Michael Crutchfield: Homicide Detective in Sergeant Landsman's unit who gets his tie cut, having fallen asleep after working a double shift.

References

External links
"Back Burners" at HBO.com

The Wire (season 3) episodes
2004 American television episodes
Television episodes directed by Tim Van Patten